The I/13 highway is a highway located in northwestern Czech Republic. The route leads through the Karlovy Vary, Ústí nad Labem and Liberec Regions. The road starts in Karlovy Vary at the intersection with road I/6 and ends at the Habartice/Zawidów border crossing with Poland.

Route
The I/13 highway passes through the following cities and towns:
Karlovy Vary region 
Karlovy Vary
Ostrov
Ústí nad Labem Region 
Klášterec nad Ohří
Chomutov
Most
Bílina
Teplice
Děčín
Liberec Region 
Nový Bor, here it intersects with road I/9 from Prague
Cvikov
Chrastava
Liberec
Frýdlant

References 

I13